Flash card may refer to:
 Flashcard,  a set of cards with words etc. on them, used for education and training
 Memory card, electronic data storage, a form of flash memory
 Flash cartridge, for a video game console, programmable by a consumer, often for homemade or copied games